Kitābu ṣalāti s-sawā'ī is a book of hours printed in Arabic in 1514. It is the first known book printed in Arabic with movable type.

History 
It was almost certainly printed by Gregorio di Gregorii. Miroslav Krek determined it was very probably printed in Venice, despite the colophonic attribution to Fano, although this is disputed. Other sources claim it was in fact printed in Fano, at an Arabic printing press established by Pope Julius II.

Contents 
The psalms used are those of the eleventh-century Melkite bishop, Abd Allah ibn al-Fadl.

Known existing copies 
The scholar Nuria Torres Santo Domingo located a number of existing copies, listed below:

Italy

 Biblioteca Estense, Modena
 Biblioteca Medicea-Laurenziana, Florence
 Biblioteca Ambrosiana, Milan

France

 Bibliothèque nationale de France, Paris

United Kingdom

 British Museum, London
 Bodleian Library, Oxford

Germany

 Bavarian State Library, Munich

 Zentralbibliothek Sondersammlungen, Rostock

Netherlands

 Leiden University Library, Leiden

Spain

 Biblioteca Histórica Marqués de Valdecilla, Madrid

Sweden

 Carolina Rediviva, Uppsala

Egypt

 Egyptian National Library and Archives, Cairo

United States

 Princeton University Library, Princeton

References 

16th-century Arabic books
Devotional literature
1514 books